Jafarbay-e Gharbi Rural District is a rural district (dehestan) in Gomishan District, Torkaman County, Golestan Province, Iran. At the 2006 census, its population was 13,650, in 2,652 families.  The rural district has 12 villages.

References 

Rural Districts of Golestan Province
Torkaman County